Mankhan Nature Reserve is a reserve in the western part of Mongolia. It is located south of Khar Us Nuur National Park in Khovd Province on the main road between Hovd City and Ulaanbaatar. Most of the area lies in the Mankhan sum. In addition to these antelopes, there are also goitered gazelles.

References 
 Mallon, D.P. and Kingswood, S.C. (compilers). (2001). Antelopes. Part 4: North Africa, the Middle East, and Asia. Global Survey and Regional Action Plans. SSC Antelope Specialist Group. IUCN, GLand, Switzerland and Cambridge, UK.

External links 
 Information to Mankhan Nature Reserve

Nature reserves in Mongolia